The Providence Clamdiggers was a member of the American Soccer League. They were renamed the Providence Gold Bugs before the spring half of the 1928–1929 season. In the fall of 1929, the team installed lights at its field, allowing for night games. The club won the American Soccer Association Cup in 1929.

After the fall 1930 season, the club was bought and became the Fall River F.C.

History
Between 1924 and 1930 they played as the Fall River F.C. in the American Soccer League. In 1931, after Sam Mark, owner of the Fall River Marksmen, relocated his team to New York and renamed them the New York Yankees, he made their former home ground, Mark's Stadium, available to anybody willing to place a team there. A group of Fall River businessmen, led by an ex-Marksmen player Harold Brittan, then bought Providence Gold Bugs, moved them into Mark's Stadium and renamed them Fall River F.C. The new club played for just one season, Spring 1931, eventually finishing fifth. However, during their short existence they did win two notable prestige friendlies. On February 22, 1931, they beat Vélez Sársfield 5–2. Then on May 31 with a team that included Joe Kennaway, Bill Paterson and Tom Florie they beat Celtic 1–0. Kennaway subsequently signed for Celtic after impressing them with his performance in goal.

By early 1931 the Great Depression had severely effected the stability of the ASL and several teams relocated, merged and even disappeared. On April 19, 1931, Fall River absorbed New Bedford Whalers before they themselves were absorbed by New York Yankees during the summer. This new team then revived the New Bedford Whalers name for the Fall 1931 season.

Year-by-year

Honors
 League Champion
 Runner Up (1): 1929

 American Soccer Association Cup
 Winner (1): 1929

Coaches
 Sam Fletcher: 1924-1929

References

Defunct soccer clubs in Rhode Island
American Soccer League (1921–1933) teams
1930 disestablishments in Rhode Island
Association football clubs disestablished in 1930